Knowl Johnson is an American actor born on September 16, 1970, in Greenwich, Connecticut, United States.  He is known for his vocal work as Brother Bear in several of the Berenstain Bears television specials such as The Berenstain Bears' Easter Surprise (1981), The Berenstain Bears' Comic Valentine (1982), and The Berenstain Bears Play Ball (1983).

Film credits
Aside from his voice acting career, Johnson has appeared in several motion pictures, including Steel Magnolias (1989), Lean on Me (1989) and Toy Soldiers (1991).

External links
 

American male film actors
American male child actors
American male voice actors
1970 births
Living people
Male actors from Connecticut
20th-century American male actors